Bdellocephala is a genus of freshwater triclad that inhabits different regions of Eurasia.

Description
As in other genera of the family Dendrocoelidae, species of Bdellocephala have an anterior adhesive organ. However, differently from other dendrocoelids, species of Bdellocephala lack a well-developed penis papilla in the male copulatory apparatus, which is uncommon in freshwater planarians.

Species 

Bdellocephala angarensis
Bdellocephala annandalei
Bdellocephala baicalensis
Bdellocephala bathyalis
Bdellocephala borealis
Bdellocephala brunnea
Bdellocephala grubiiformis
Bdellocephala melanocinerea
Bdellocephala punctata
Bdellocephala roseocula
Bdellocephala stellomaculata
Bdellocephala ushkaniensis

References 

Dendrocoelidae
Taxa named by Johannes Govertus de Man